Ricky L. Thomas (born March 29, 1965) is a former American football defensive back in the National Football League (NFL). He played college football at Alabama. Following a brief stint in the NFL with the Seattle Seahawks, he began a long coaching career spanning thirty years spent at the high school, college, and NFL level, including time coaching for the Tampa Bay Buccaneers and Indianapolis Colts, with whom he earned a championship ring following the team's win in Super Bowl XLI.  Following the conclusion of his coaching career in 2018, he returned to The McCallie School in Chattanooga, TN, where he was the head coach between 1992 and 1996. He currently holds the title of Dean of Community and Brotherhood.

References

External links
 Georgia State Panthers bio 
 Nevada Wolf Pack bio

1965 births
Living people
American football cornerbacks
American football safeties
Alabama Crimson Tide football players
Gardner–Webb Runnin' Bulldogs football coaches
Georgia State Panthers football coaches
Indianapolis Colts coaches
National Football League replacement players
Nevada Wolf Pack football coaches
Seattle Seahawks players
Southwest Minnesota State Mustangs football coaches
Tampa Bay Buccaneers coaches
High school football coaches in Alabama
High school football coaches in Tennessee
African-American coaches of American football
African-American players of American football
21st-century African-American people
20th-century African-American sportspeople